Princess Alexia of the Netherlands, Princess of Orange-Nassau (full name: Alexia Juliana Marcela Laurentien; born on 26 June 2005) is the second daughter of Willem-Alexander of the Netherlands and Queen Máxima of the Netherlands. Princess Alexia is a member of the Dutch royal house and second in the line of succession to the Dutch throne.

Life
Princess Alexia was born on 26 June 2005 at HMC Bronovo in The Hague as the second child of Willem-Alexander, then Prince of Orange, and his wife, Máxima. The infant's uncles Prince Friso and Juan Zorreguieta, the Duchess of Brabant, Alexandra Jankovich de Jeszenice, and Jonkheer Frans Ferdinand de Beaufort stood as godparents at baptism by Reverend Deodaat van der Boon on 19 November 2005 in the Dorpskerk in Wassenaar.

Princess Alexia attended the public primary school Bloemcampschool in Wassenaar. She attended secondary school at the Christelijk Gymnasium Sorghvliet in The Hague from 2017 to 2021. Beginning in August 2021, she is continuing her secondary education at the United World College of the Atlantic in Wales, where her father was also a student. Alexia speaks Dutch, English, and Spanish.

Alexia's friend, Jan de Beaufort, son of Alexia's godfather died in 2022 at the age of 19.

Hospitalization 
In February 2016, while on a skiing holiday with her family in Austria, Princess Alexia broke her right femur. She was transported via helicopter to a local hospital and had surgery to repair the injury. After a few days in the hospital she was released and required the use of crutches while she healed. Updates on Princess Alexia's condition were posted on the official website of the Dutch monarchy. The accident occurred in the same area as the avalanche which resulted in eventually fatal injuries to her paternal uncle and godfather, Prince Friso, in February 2012.

Titles, styles and arms
Alexia's full title and style is "Her Royal Highness Princess Alexia of the Netherlands, Princess of Orange-Nassau".

References

External links

 Princess Alexia on the website of the Royal House of the Netherlands

2005 births
Living people
House of Orange-Nassau
Dutch people of German descent
Dutch people of Argentine descent
Dutch people of Basque descent
Dutch people of Italian descent
Dutch people of Portuguese descent
Dutch people of Spanish descent
Princesses of Orange-Nassau
People from Wassenaar
Daughters of kings
People educated at Atlantic College